Ulceby is the name of two villages in England:

 Ulceby, East Lindsey, Lincolnshire, and the hamlet of Ulceby Cross 
 Ulceby with Fordington civil parish
 Ulceby, North Lincolnshire
 Ulceby railway station

See also
Ulceby Skitter